Debbie Newsome (born 1960) is a former Australian television personality, married to Mark Learmonth, a mother of two (Tara Pavlovic & Troy Pavlovic) and lives in Central Coast, New South Wales, Australia. Best known for her role as a co-host on Perfect Match Australia.

In 1989, Newsome launched the Debbie Newsome show, produced by Dee Lampe, initially partnering with New Zealand singer Lou Pihama at the North Sydney Leagues Club with Derek Williams as arranger and musical director, before touring New South Wales with Williams and his 8 piece showband.  This marked her transition from the screen to the stage, and she now works as a singer, performing a Janis Joplin tribute show. Newsome also appeared in the James Bond movie For Your Eyes Only.

In July 2017, Newsome was interviewed by Craig Bennett on Network Ten in a recap of her Perfect Match Australia days. Her daughter, Tara has appeared on many Reality TV shows like Bachelor in Paradise, The Bachelor and All Star Family Feud.

Discography

Singles

References

Australian television presenters
Australian women television presenters
Living people
1960 births